Guan Ying (died January 176 BC), posthumously known as Marquis Yi of Yingyin, was a Chinese military general and politician who served as a chancellor of the Western Han dynasty.

Life
Guan Ying was from Suiyang, which is present-day Shangqiu, Henan. He served under Liu Bang, the founding emperor of the Han dynasty, and joined him in rebelling against the Qin dynasty. He also fought on Liu Bang's side during the Chu–Han Contention and assisted him in overcoming his rival, Xiang Yu.

After Liu Bang became emperor and established the Han dynasty, Guan Ying served as General of Chariots and Cavalry.

Following Liu Bang's death, Empress Lü and her clan seized power from the Liu family and controlled the Han government – this event is historically known as the Lü Clan Disturbance. After Empress Lü died in August 180 BCE, the prince Liu Xiang decided to rebel against the Lü clan; Guan Ying was appointed General-in-Chief and ordered to lead an army to suppress the revolt. However, he led his troops elsewhere instead and combined forces with Zhou Bo, Chen Ping and others who were loyal to the Liu family to oust the Lü clan from power and install Liu Heng (Emperor Wen), a son of Liu Bang, on the throne. After becoming emperor, Emperor Wen appointed Guan Ying as Grand Commandant and subsequently promoted him to the position of Chancellor, replacing Zhou Bo. Guan Ying died in office after about a year and was given the posthumous name Marquis Yi.

References

Citations

Bibliography
 Sima Qian et al. Records of the Grand Historian (Shi Ji) vol. 95.
 Ban Gu et al. Book of Han (Han Shu) vol. 41.
 

176 BC deaths
Han dynasty generals from Henan
Han dynasty politicians from Henan
Politicians from Shangqiu